Houbigant Parfum is a perfume manufacturer founded in Paris, France in 1775 by Jean-François Houbigant of Grasse (1752–1807). The brand originally sold gloves, perfumes, and bridal bouquets. The original shop À la Corbeille de Fleurs operated at 19, rue du Faubourg Saint-Honoré. Over the centuries, the House of Houbigant became the perfumer to the royal courts of Europe including Napoleon, Napoleon III, Alexander III of Russia, and Queen Victoria.

History

In 1882 the House launched Fougère Royale, the first fougère (or 'fern-like') perfume ever created, establishing a new fragrance family which still remains today the most popular family in men's fragrances.

During this period, under the direction of the Paris office, offices were established in the United States, England, Belgium, the Netherlands, Switzerland, Italy, Spain, Poland, and Romania. The New York office had its own manufacturing facility to distribute Houbigant goods nationwide.

Houbigant was also the first perfume house to discover how to isolate particular molecules from natural raw materials—specifically, coumarin, which is isolated from the tonka bean. In 1912, they introduced Quelques Fleurs, the first true multi-floral bouquet ever created. Up to that time, floral fragrances had been mostly single flowers or were blended with herbs and other essences. The Genealogy of Perfumes cites Quelques Fleurs as an innovation that established a totally new fragrance classification and influenced other compositions for years afterwards, including many of today’s important fragrances.

Current status
The Houbigant fragrances are now being manufactured under the original specifications by LOFT Fashion and Beauty Diffusion of Monaco and marketed in the United States by Exclusive Fragrances and Cosmetics.

Timeline 
 1775: Perfumer Jean-François Houbigant opens À la Corbeille de Fleurs, Rue Faubourg St Honoré
 1807: Perfumer Armand-Gustave Houbigant, the son of Jean-François, joins the house
 1807: Houbigant was appointed personal perfumer to Napoleon and created a special perfume for Empress Josephine
 Early 19th century: Houbigant was appointed as perfumer to Princess Adelaide d'Orléans, mother of King Louis-Philippe.
 1838: The French house was awarded the licence of "Perfumer to Her Majesty, Queen Victoria of the United Kingdom".
 1880: perfumer Paul Parquet became joint owner.
 1882: Paul Parquet creates Fougère Royale.
 1890: Tsar Alexander III named Houbigant perfumer to the Imperial Court of Russia
 1912: Perfumer Robert Bienaimé joined Houbigant and created fragrances for the house until he founded his own in 1935.
 1912: Robert Bienaimé introduced Quelques Fleurs.
pre-1950: perfumers Paul Schving and Marcel Billot created perfumes for Houbigant
 1990: Houbigant relaunched Lutece from prestige department store brand to domestic brand.
 1980s: Houbigant relaunched Quelques Fleurs.
 1985: Houbigant launched Duc de Vervins.
 1998: Houbigant launched Quelques Fleurs Royale.
 2010: Houbigant relaunched Fougère Royale.
 2012: Houbigant launched Orangers en Fleurs.

References

External links 
 Houbigant Official Website

British Royal Warrant holders
Perfume houses
Purveyors to the Russian imperial family
Companies based in Paris
French brands